Paul Khoarai (May 29, 1933 – December 27, 2012) was the Roman Catholic bishop of the Roman Catholic Diocese of Leribe, Lesotho.

Ordained to the priesthood in 1963, Khoarai was named bishop in 1970 and retired in 2009.

Notes

1933 births
2012 deaths
Lesotho Roman Catholic bishops
Roman Catholic bishops of Leribe